The 1989–90 Boise State Broncos men's basketball team represented Boise State University during the 1989–90 NCAA Division I men's basketball season. The Broncos were led by seventh-year head coach Bobby Dye and played their home games on campus at the BSU Pavilion in Boise, Idaho.

The conference tournament was at home in Boise, but the Broncos did not qualify for the six-team field. It remains the only time in the tourney's history that the host did not play; it moved to neutral sites beginning in 2016.

References

External links
Sports Reference – Boise State Broncos – 1989–90 basketball season

Boise State Broncos men's basketball seasons
Boise State
Boise State